Pseudaltha atramentifera is a species of moth of the family Limacodidae. It is found in India (including the Khasi Hills).

References

Limacodidae
Moths described in 1931
Taxa named by Erich Martin Hering
Moths of Asia